Wendie Malick (born December 13, 1950) is an American actress and former fashion model, known for her roles in various television comedies. She starred as Judith Tupper Stone in the HBO sitcom Dream On, and as Nina Van Horn in the NBC sitcom Just Shoot Me!, for which she was nominated for two Primetime Emmys and a Golden Globe Award.

She also starred as Victoria Chase in the TV Land comedy series Hot in Cleveland. She is also known for her recurring role as Gayle Buchannon on Baywatch as well as Ronee Lawrence on the final season of Frasier. Malick also played many character roles in films, including Scrooged, The American President, Racing Stripes, and Confessions of a Shopaholic, has made over 50 guest appearances on television shows, primarily on comedies, starred in a number of made for television movies, and works as a voice actress, playing Eda Clawthorne on the Disney Channel animated series The Owl House.

Early life
Malick was born on December 13, 1950 in Buffalo, New York, the daughter of Gigi, a former model, and Kenneth Malick (1920–2021), who worked in sales. Her paternal grandfather, Ayad Malick was an Egyptian from a Coptic Christian family who met her grandmother Sarah Belle Float, a Pentecostal missionary in 1913. Her other ancestry is French, German, and English. She graduated from Williamsville South High School in 1968. Malick is an alumna of the William Esper Studio for the performing arts in Manhattan, New York City.

Career

Early career
 
After graduating from Ohio Wesleyan University in Delaware, Ohio, in 1972, Malick began fashion modeling for the Wilhelmina modeling agency. She left to work for Republican Congressman Jack Kemp. She soon left Washington, D.C., to pursue a career in stage and screen. She began working as an actress in 1982 in the film A Little Sex. In same year, Malick auditioned for the role of Diane Chambers in the NBC sitcom Cheers, but lost the part. She later was cast as a regular in ABC medical drama series Trauma Center. The series was cancelled after a single season. In 1986, Malick guest starred as Cecile's henchwoman in the 5,559th episode of Another World. In the late 1980s, Malick began her career in television comedies. She had a recurring role on Kate & Allie as Allie's ex-husband's new wife and played a supporting role in the 1988 film Scrooged as Bill Murray's sister-in-law.

Dream On and Just Shoot Me!
In 1990, Malick was cast in the HBO comedy series Dream On as Judith Tupper Stone, Brian Benben's neurotic but endearing ex-wife. She remained on this show until it ended in 1996, winning four CableACE Awards for Best Actress in a Comedy Series. During Dream On years, Malick also acted in other television series, appearing in dramas, such as NYPD Blue as a battered socialite in 1993, and L.A. Law and Tales from the Crypt, and sitcoms, including Mad About You, Seinfeld, and Cybill. She also appeared in several television films, including Dynasty: The Reunion (1991), Madonna: Innocence Lost (1994), and Apollo 11 (1996). Malick starred in the 1999 Lifetime Television movie Take My Advice: The Ann and Abby Story, in which she played the dual roles of identical twin sibling advice columnists Ann Landers (Eppie Lederer) and "Dear Abby" Abigail Van Buren (Pauline Phillips). As lead actress, she starred in the 1997 independent drama film Jerome.

In 1996, Malick starred as the lead character in her own comedy series, Good Company on CBS. The show was cancelled after only six episodes. In 1997, she began starring as Nina Van Horn, a shallow, boozing former supermodel on the NBC sitcom Just Shoot Me!. She continued in this role until the show ended in 2003. She was nominated for a Primetime Emmy Award for Outstanding Supporting Actress in a Comedy Series in 1999 and 2002, and a Golden Globe Award for Best Supporting Actress – Series, Miniseries or Television Film in 1999. She also guest-starred on The X-Files in 1998. She starred in Disney's animated film The Emperor's New Groove as Chicha in 2000 alongside her fellow Just Shoot Me co-star David Spade, who voices Emperor Kuzco. In 2000, Malick was honored by Women in Film as A Woman of Vision, along with Tipper Gore, Gwen Ifill, and Roseanne Barr.

In 2003, Malick joined the cast of Cheers spin-off Frasier, portraying Ronee Lawrence, a Seattle lounge singer (and Frasier's (Kelsey Grammer) childhood babysitter) who develops a relationship with Frasier's father, Martin Crane (John Mahoney). Eventually, her character married Martin in the series finale "Goodnight, Seattle". Malick and Mahoney also both appeared in 1995 film The American President. In 2002, she starred opposite Shirley Jones and Cloris Leachman in the comedy film Manna from Heaven. She provided the voice of Principal Folsom for the Disney animated series Fillmore! until its end in 2004. In 2005, she co-starred in the Nickelodeon animated series The X's as Miss X.

Later career and Hot in Cleveland
From 2005 to 2006, Malick starred opposite John Stamos in the ABC comedy series Jake in Progress. Malick was to be part of the cast of the series Modern Men, but due to a Jake in Progress renewal, her role on Modern Men was recast with Jane Seymour. Both Jake in Progress and Modern Men were cancelled in 2006. Also in 2005, Malick starred as Clara Dalrymple in the movie Racing Stripes. In 2005 and 2006, she provided the voice of Burdine Maxwell in the animated series Bratz. In late 2006 and early 2007, she starred in another short-lived comedy series, Big Day on ABC. Starting in 2005, Malick did voice work on radio and television ads for Marshalls department stores. Malick guest-starred on CSI: Crime Scene Investigation and Law & Order in 2005. In film, she appeared in Waiting..., Adventureland, and Confessions of a Shopaholic as the instructor of the "Shopaholics Anonymous" group, Miss Korch.

In 2010, Malick was cast as Victoria Chase, a six-time-divorced, Emmy Award-winning soap opera star, in the TV Land comedy series Hot in Cleveland, alongside Jane Leeves, Valerie Bertinelli, and Betty White. The series made ratings success for TV Land, and won generally favorable reviews from critics. In 2011, Malick was a promising contender for an Emmy Award in the Outstanding Lead Actress in a Comedy Series category, though she did not receive a nomination. In 2012, the Hot in Cleveland cast and she were nominated for a Screen Actors Guild Award for Outstanding Performance by an Ensemble in a Comedy Series. On November 17, 2014, TV Land announced season six would be the final season for show.

In April 2011, Malick became the celebrity spokesperson for Budget Rent a Car in a series of online and television ads. Malick starred in the 2013 Hallmark original movie After All These Years based on the book by best-selling author Susan Isaccs.

After Hot in Cleveland, Malick landed the role in the CBS action comedy-drama series Rush Hour, based on the film franchise of the same name. The series was cancelled after one season. Malick later joined the cast of Fox drama series Pitch in a recurring role as Maxine Armstrong. In 2016 she appeared as Sebastian Lund's (Rob Kerkovich) mother, Sylvia in the fourth episode of NCIS: New Orleans. From 2016 to 2021, she had a recurring role of lead character' mother in the ABC comedy series, American Housewife. Malick also appeared on Mom, Grace and Frankie, This Is Us, Modern Family, and Physical.

From 2014 to 2020, Malick had a recurring voice role playing the titular character's mother on the Netflix animated series BoJack Horseman. In 2018, she received Annie Awards nomination for her voice acting. From 2018 to 2020, she also had a recurring role as rancher Lisa Neumann on Netflix comedy series The Ranch. In 2020, she was cast as the voice of Edalyn Clawthorne on The Owl House.

Malick played Shailene Woodley's character mother in the 2019 romantic drama film Endings, Beginnings, and title role in the 2020 Lifetime thriller Deranged Granny. In 2022, she set to appear in a multiple features, include Mack & Rita starring Diane Keaton, A Little White Lie, The Re-Education of Molly Singer, and the leading role in the musical drama Mother of All Shows.

Personal life
Malick has been married twice: from 1982 to 1989 to actor and screenwriter Mitch Glazer, and since 1995 to Richard Erickson. The couple lives in Topanga, California in the Santa Monica Mountains where they have three dogs, two horses, and a cat. Malick is a pescetarian. She donates to Democratic political candidates, organizations, and causes.

Filmography

Film

Television

Video games

Awards and nominations

References

External links

 
 
 
 

1950 births
Living people
Actresses from Buffalo, New York
American female models
American film actresses
American people of Arab descent
American people of Coptic descent
American people of Egyptian descent
American people of English descent
American people of French descent
American people of German descent
American television actresses
American voice actresses
American animal rights activists
California Democrats
Ohio Wesleyan University alumni
People from Topanga, California
William Esper Studio alumni
20th-century American actresses
21st-century American actresses